The Autumn Stakes is a Canadian Thoroughbred horse race run annually at Woodbine Racetrack in Toronto, Ontario. Run in mid November, it is open to horses aged three and older. It was raced on dirt until 2006 when the track's owners installed the new synthetic Polytrack surface. For 2008, the Canadian Graded Stakes Committee upgraded the Autumn Stakes to Grade II status.

The inaugural running in 1902 was won by the filly Janice, owned and trained by the prominent Kentucky horseman, Green B. Morris. Beginning in 1920, Kentucky Derby winner and U.S. Racing Hall of Fame inductee, Exterminator, won the race three straight years, more than any other horse. In 1991, Francine Villeneuve became the first female jockey to win the race.

Called the Toronto Autumn Cup before 1931, and Autumn Stakes Handicap from 1953 to 1954, it was run in two divisions in 1980 and 1981. There was no race held in 1917, 1918, 1919, 1940 and 1950. Since inception, the race has been run at various distances:
 1 mile: 1980-1993 at Greenwood Raceway
  miles: 1902 & 1935, 1953-1955 at Old Woodbine Racetrack
  miles: 1903-1934 at Old Woodbine Racetrack, 1956-1960  at Greenwood Raceway, 1961-1979 at Woodbine Racetrack
  miles: 1936-1952 at Old Woodbine Racetrack, 1994 to present at Woodbine Racetrack

Records
Time record: (at current distance of  miles)
 1:41.80 - Freedom Fleet (1995)

Most wins:
 3 - Exterminator (1920, 1921, 1922)

Most wins by an owner:
 4 - George M. Hendrie (1913, 1914, 1915, 1916)
 4 - Willis Sharpe Kilmer (1920, 1921, 1922, 1930)

Most wins by a jockey:
 5 - Patrick Husbands (2000, 2003, 2008, 2012, 2021)

Most wins by a trainer:
 6 - Roger L. Attfield (1980, 1982, 1987, 2009, 2015, 2016)

Winners

See also
 List of Canadian flat horse races

References
 The Autumn Stakes at Pedigree Query

Graded stakes races in Canada
Open mile category horse races
Woodbine Racetrack
Recurring sporting events established in 1902
1902 establishments in Ontario